Governors Island is one of the few islands with permanent residents on Lake Norman, in Westport, a community in Catawba Springs Township, in Lincoln County, North Carolina, USA. The island is a small, wealthy community located 20 miles northwest of Charlotte, North Carolina, and less than half a mile from mainland Westport in the piedmont of North Carolina. This community is in the Denver, NC zipcode of 28037. The largest subdivision nearby to the north is SailView, a Crescent Community also in Denver NC. The total population estimate for the island was less than 200 residents as of 2010.

This gated community is home to approximately 40 affluent homeowners.

References

Sources
 West Lake Norman Community Information 
 Governors Island, NC -  Real Estate Guide

Lake islands of North Carolina
Populated places in Lincoln County, North Carolina
Landforms of Lincoln County, North Carolina